Sweet Valley is an unincorporated community in Ross Township, Luzerne County, in the U.S. state of Pennsylvania.

History
A post office called Sweet Valley has been in operation since 1847. Josiah Ruggles was the first postmaster, and the community's first merchant.

Gallery

References

Unincorporated communities in Luzerne County, Pennsylvania
Unincorporated communities in Pennsylvania